Adriano Angeloni (born 31 January 1983 in Frascati) is an Italian former cyclist.

Major results
2005
1st  U23 National Road Race Championships
2007
1st Giro del Medio Brenta
2010
1st Trophée de la Maison Royale
3rd Grand Prix of Donetsk

References

1983 births
Living people
Italian male cyclists
Sportspeople from the Metropolitan City of Rome Capital
Cyclists from Lazio